Nicolás Aldo Peranic (born 2 June 1985) is an Argentine-Chilean footballer that currently plays for Universidad Católica in the Chilean Primera División.

Personal life
Peranic is of Croatian descent since his grandfather, Dinko Ante Peranich, came to Argentina from Yugoslavia in the middle of the 20th century and made his home in Chaco Province, changing his name to Domingo Antonio Peranic.

Both Peranic and his wife graduated as PE teachers.

Peranic holds dual Argentine-Chilean citizenship since he received his naturalization certificate in July 2022.

Career statistics

Club

References

External links
 
 

1985 births
Living people
People from Ituzaingó Partido
Sportspeople from Buenos Aires Province
Argentine people of Croatian descent
Argentine footballers
Argentine expatriate footballers
Naturalized citizens of Chile
Chilean people of Croatian descent
Argentine emigrants to Chile
Chilean footballers
Flandria footballers
Club Atlético Acassuso footballers
General Lamadrid footballers
Asociación Social y Deportiva Justo José de Urquiza players
Defensores Unidos footballers
Club Almagro players
Deportes Magallanes footballers
Magallanes footballers
San Marcos de Arica footballers
Deportes Melipilla footballers
Club Deportivo Universidad Católica footballers
Primera B Metropolitana players
Primera B de Chile players
Chilean Primera División players
Argentine expatriate sportspeople in Chile
Expatriate footballers in Chile
Association football goalkeepers